Paul Jarrico (January 12, 1915 – October 28, 1997) was an American screenwriter and film producer who was blacklisted by the Hollywood movie studio bosses during the era of McCarthyism.

Biography

Early years
Paul Jarrico was born in Los Angeles, California on January 12, 1915, as Israel Shapiro. His father was a Russian Jewish immigrant, a lawyer, poet and socialist. While attending UCLA, Jarrico joined the Young Communist League, where he became an active member of the American Communist Party. His alliance and association with the party lasted from 1937 to 1952. Jarrico married Sylvia Gussin in 1936.  Sylvia's younger sister, Zelma, married screenwriter Michael Wilson in 1941.

Film career

During the 1930s, Jarrico began his writing career. He mostly wrote crime and comedy scripts for lower budget Hollywood films with Columbia Pictures. Among these films were No Time to Marry (1937), I Am the Law (1938), and Beauty for the Asking (1939), starring Lucille Ball. In the early 1940s, Jarrico was sent to Northern Africa and Italy to be a merchant marine in World War II. When he returned home he restarted his career with Metro Goldwyn Mayer Pictures. His 1941 film Tom, Dick and Harry, starring Ginger Rogers, was nominated for an Academy Award for Best Original Screenplay.

In 1943, Jarrico co-scripted the feature film Song of Russia. The film was created under pressure from president Franklin D. Roosevelt to garner sympathy from the public for the Soviet cause in their war against Germany. Some other successful films written by Jarrico in the 1940s include Thousands Cheer (1943), The Search (1948) and Not Wanted (1949).

Blacklisted

Jarrico had engaged in a protracted legal battle with Howard Hughes, the head of RKO.  In 1950, while working on his newest script for the Howard Hughes film, The White Tower, a friend close to Jarrico gave his name to the House Un-American Activities Committee. Immediately upon hearing the news of Jarrico's subpoena, Hughes dismissed Jarrico from the film. After refusing to testify before HUAC, Jarrico was blacklisted and his passport was confiscated. This made it extremely difficult for him to make films. No American studios were willing to make his scripts into movies, and he could not go to other countries due to his lack of a passport. 

In 1954, Jarrico went to New Mexico with Herbert J. Biberman, a fellow blacklist filmmaker, where they created the film Salt of the Earth. The film was the only one to be made by blacklisted filmmakers, and therefore became blacklisted itself, making it the only blacklisted film. The film was one of 100 films chosen by the Library of Congress for the National Film Registry in 1992.

In 1958, he moved to Europe where he lived for over twenty years. During the 1960s he used the pseudonym Peter Achilles to co-script several films, including Jovanka e l’Altri (1960), Call Me Bwana (1963), Der Schatz der Azteken (1965) and La Balada de Johnny Ringo (1966). He also wrote scripts for television in Europe all throughout the 1960s.

Personal life and death 

In 1966 Jarrico divorced Sylvia Gussin, his wife of 30 years, to marry a Frenchwoman, Yvette Le Floc'h, from whom he separated in 1977. He then returned to the United States where he met and, in 1992, married Lia Benedetti. He spent the rest of his life in California. He taught courses at the University of California at Santa Barbara and lectured on film theory and the blacklist in the U.S. and Europe.

Jarrico died on October 28, 1997, in a car accident. He was returning home after attending events commemorating the beginnings of the blacklist fifty years earlier. He was 82 years old.

Filmography

No Time to Marry (1937)	
I Am the Law  (1938)
The Little Adventuress (1938)
Beauty for the Asking (1939)
The Face Behind the Mask (1941)
Tom, Dick and Harry (1941)
Thousands Cheer (1943)
Song of Russia (1943)
The Search (1948)
Not Wanted (1949)
The White Tower (1950)
The Las Vegas Story (1952)
The Man Who Watched Trains Go By (1953)
Salt of the Earth (1954)	
Jovanka e l’Altr (1960)
All Night Long (1962)
Call Me Bwana (1963)		
Der Schatz der Azteken (1965) 	
Die Pyramide des Sonnegottes (1965)	
La Balada de Johnny Ringo (1966)
Le Rouble a deux faces (1967)	
Atentat u Sarajevu (1976)	
Bilitis (1977)	
Messenger of Death (1988)

Further reading
 Caballero, Raymond. McCarthyism vs. Clinton Jencks. Norman: University of Oklahoma Press, 2019.

References

External links
Interview of Paul Jarrico, part of Hollywood Blacklist interview series, Center for Oral History Research, UCLA Library Special Collections, University of California, Los Angeles.]

Finding aid to Paul Jarrico papers at Columbia University. Rare Book & Manuscript Library.

1915 births
1997 deaths
American male screenwriters
Hollywood blacklist
Members of the Communist Party USA
Writers from Los Angeles
Road incident deaths in California
American expatriates in Czechoslovakia
Screenwriters from California
Robert Meltzer Award winners
20th-century American male writers
20th-century American screenwriters